NA-49 (Tribal Area-X) is a constituency for the National Assembly of Pakistan comprising Ladha Subdivision, Makin Subdivision, Sararogha Subdivision, and Serwekai Subdivision of South Waziristan.

Members of Parliament

2002–2018: NA-42 (Tribal Area-VII)

Since 2018: NA-49 (Tribal Area-X)

Election 2002 

General elections were held on 10 Oct 2002. Muhammad Miraj-ud-Din an Independent candidate won by 12,360 votes.

Election 2008 

Due to security reason elections didn't take place.

Election 2013 

General elections were held on 11 May 2013. Muhammad Jamal Ud Din of JUI-F won by 3,468 votes and became the  member of National Assembly.

Election 2018

General elections were held on 25 July 2018.

†JUI-F contested as part of MMA

See also
NA-48 (Tribal Area-IX)
NA-50 (Tribal Area-XI)

References

External links 
 Election result's official website

49
49